The United Norwegian Lutheran Church of America (UNLC) was the result of the union in 1890 of the Norwegian Augustana Synod (est. 1870), the Conference of the Norwegian-Danish Evangelical Lutheran Church of America (1870), and the Anti-Missourian Brotherhood (1887). Some sources give the church's name as "in America" instead of "of America",

In 1897, a group of congregations left the UNLC and formed the Lutheran Free Church. In 1900, another group of congregations left to form the Church of the Lutheran Brethren of America. 

The UNLC merged in 1917 with two other Norwegian-American synods, the Hauge Synod (est. 1876) and the Norwegian Synod (1853), to form the Norwegian Lutheran Church of America, whose name was later changed to the Evangelical Lutheran Church. That body later merged into the American Lutheran Church, which itself became part of the Evangelical Lutheran Church in America. Marcus Olaus Bockman was president of the United Church Seminary in Saint Paul, Minnesota, which was operated by the UNLC until the 1917 merger.

Presidents
 Gjermund Hoyme 1890–1902
 Theodor H. Dahl 1902–1917

References
Fevold, Eugene L. The Lutheran Free Church: A Fellowship of American Lutheran Congregations 1897–1963 (Minneapolis, Mn: Augsburg Publishing House, 1969)
Nelson, E. Clifford, and Fevold, Eugene L. The Lutheran Church among Norwegian-Americans: a history of the Evangelical Lutheran Church (Minneapolis, MN : Augsburg Publishing House, 1960)
Nichol, Todd W. All These Lutherans (Minneapolis, MN: Augburg Publishing House, 1986)

External links
Wolf, Edmund Jacob. The Lutherans in America; a story of struggle, progress, influence and marvelous growth. New York: J.A. Hill. 1889.

Evangelical Lutheran Church in America predecessor churches
Religious organizations established in 1890
Lutheran denominations established in the 19th century
Norwegian-American history